Harmony, in music, is the use of simultaneous pitches (tones, notes), or chords.

Harmony or harmonious may also refer to:

Computing
Apache Harmony, a Java programming language Open source implementation
ECMAScript Harmony, codename for the sixth edition of the scripting language
Harmony (operating system), an experimental computer operating system developed at the National Research Council of Canada
Harmony (software), a music visualizer program
Harmony (toolkit), a never-completed Qt-like software widget toolkit
HarmonyOS, also known as Hongmeng OS, a IoT and mobile operating system developed by Huawei
Harmony search, an evolutionary algorithm used in optimization problems
Harmony technology, developed by RealNetworks; see 
Logitech Harmony, a series of universal remote controls made by Logitech
Project Harmony (FOSS group), a Canonical initiative about contributor agreements for Open Source software
 Toon Boom Harmony, a Toon Boom Animation application

Fictional characters
"Harmony" (Glee), in the television series Glee
Harmony Hamilton or Yolanda Hamilton, in the television seriesThe Young and the Restless
Harmony Kendall, in the television series Buffy the Vampire Slayer and Angel
Harmony O'Neill (character), in the television series Shortland Street
Harmony Parker, in the novel The Queen's Nose by Dick King-Smith
Harmony, in the television series Hi Hi Puffy AmiYumi
Harmony, in the film Toy Story 4

Film and television
Harmony (2010 film), a South Korean film
Harmony (2015 film), a Japanese anime film based on the novel by Project Itoh
Harmony (2018 film), an Australian fantasy thriller film
"Harmony" (Haven), a television episode
"Harmony" (Stargate Atlantis), a television episode
Harmony, the fictional setting for the soap opera Passions

Literature
Harmony (Schenker), a 1906 book on music theory by Heinrich Schenker
Harmony: A New Way of Looking at Our World, a 2010 book by Charles, Prince of Wales, with Tony Juniper and Ian Skelly
Harmony, a 2010 novel by Project Itoh

Music

Groups
Harmony (Dutch band), a 1970s pop band
Harmony (Swedish band), a Christian metal band

Albums
Harmony (Anne Murray album) or the title song, 1987
Harmony (Bill Frisell album), 2019
Harmony (Don Williams album), 1976
Harmony (Gordon Lightfoot album) or the title song, 2004
Harmony (Josh Groban album), 2020
Harmony (Londonbeat album) or the title song, 1992
Harmony (Never Shout Never album) or the title song, 2010
Harmony (The Priests album), 2009
Harmony (Sa Dingding album), 2010
Harmony (Serena Ryder album), 2012
Harmony (Three Dog Night album), 1971
Harmony (The Wake album), 1982
Harmony (Papa Lips EP), 1996
Harmony, by John Conlee, or the title song (see below), 1986

Songs
"Harmony" (Beni Arashiro song), 2004
"Harmony" (Elton John song), 1974
"Harmony" (John Conlee song), 1986
"Harmony" (Suzi Lane song), 1979
"Harmony", by Artie Kaplan, 1972
"Harmony", by the Avalanches from Wildflower, 2016
"Harmony", by Blonde Redhead from La Mia Vita Violenta, 1995
"Harmony", by Clinic from Walking with Thee, 2002
"Harmony", by Happy Mondays from Pills 'n' Thrills and Bellyaches, 1990
"Harmony", by Kylie Minogue, a B-side of "In Your Eyes", 2002
"Harmony", by Shouta Aoi, 2019
"Harmony", by Sly & the Family Stone from Life, 1968
"Harmony", by Starflyer 59 from Americana, 1997
"Harmony", written by Barry Manilow and Bruce Sussman for their musical of the same name and recorded on the 2004 album Scores, 2004
"Harmony", written by Michael Lloyd, from the Kidsongs video A Day with the Animals

Organizations and companies
Harmony (LGBT religious organization), an organization supporting LGBTQ+ members of Community of Christ
Harmony Airways, based in Vancouver, Canada
Harmony Books, an imprint of the Crown Publishing Group, itself part of publisher Penguin Random House
Harmony Company, an American stringed instrument manufacturer
Harmony Public Schools, a charter-school management organization in Texas, US
Harmony Records, a budget reissue subsidiary of Columbia Records active in the 1920s and 1930s
Harmony Society, pietist, communal, German-American religious group that existed from around 1805 to 1905

People
Harmony Hammond (born 1944), American artist, activist, curator, and writer
Harmony Ikande (born 1990), Nigerian footballer 
Harmony James, Australian singer-songwriter
Harmony Korine (born 1973), American film director and screenwriter
Harmony Samuels (born 1980), English record producer, musician, and songwriter
Harmony Santana, American actress
Harmony Tan (born 1997), French tennis player

Places

Antarctica
Harmony Point, South Shetland Islands

Canada
Harmony, Alberta
Harmony, Nova Scotia
Harmony, Perth County, Ontario
Harmony, Stormont, Dundas and Glengarry United Counties, Ontario

United States
Harmony, Arkansas
Harmony, California
Harmony, Florida
Harmony, Jefferson County, Illinois
Harmony, McHenry County, Illinois
Harmony, Indiana
Harmony, Maine
Harmony, Maryland
Harmony, Minnesota
Harmony, Monmouth County, New Jersey
Harmony, Ocean County, New Jersey
Harmony, Salem County, New Jersey
Harmony (CDP), New Jersey, a census-designated place
Harmony, New York
Harmony, North Carolina
Harmony, Ohio
Harmony, Oklahoma 
Harmony, Pennsylvania
Harmony Historic District, Harmonists' first settlement in America
Harmony, Rhode Island
Harmony, Texas
Harmony, West Virginia
Harmony, Marinette County, Wisconsin
Harmony, Price County, Wisconsin
Harmony, Rock County, Wisconsin
Harmony, Vernon County, Wisconsin
Harmony, Wyoming

Politics
 Social Democratic Party "Harmony", a Latvian political party
 National Harmony Party, a former Latvian political party dissolved in 2010 to create the former
 Harmony Centre, a former Latvian political alliance
Socialist Harmonious Society, Chinese socio-economic vision in 2000s

Ships
 Harmony (1794 ship), an American-built merchant ship
 Harmony (HBC vessel), a Hudson's Bay Company vessel 1926–1927

Other uses
Consonant harmony, in linguistics
Vowel harmony, in linguistics
The Game of Harmony, a 1990 video game published by Accolade
Harmonia, goddess of harmony and concord
Harmonious (Epcot), a nighttime show at Epcot
Harmony (ISS module), a segment of the International Space Station
Harmony Block, a design used in public housing blocks of Hong Kong
Peace
Harmony (given name)

See also

Harmonia (disambiguation)
Harmony Garden (disambiguation)
Harmony School (disambiguation)
Harmony Township (disambiguation)
New Harmony (disambiguation)

English feminine given names